Crown Australian Celebrity Poker Challenge is an Australian celebrity game show produced by Foxtel, which premiered 5 January 2006 on Australian pay TV channel FOX8. The limited run, 10-part series consisted of 36 Australian celebrities, all playing No Limit Texas Hold 'em poker, for the chance to win up to $50,000 in prize money, and $50,000 for their nominated charity. The show was hosted by former Australian Wheel of Fortune hostess Sophie Falkiner, and was recorded at Melbourne's Crown Casino in front of a live studio audience. Paul Khoury and Clinton Grybas provided the color commentary, with a running time of two hours per episode.

The grand final ended on 9 March 2006, with MTV Australia VJ Jason Dundas defeating The Weather Channel's Sally Bowrey to win the tournament and $100,000 total in prize money.

Celebrities
Featured celebrities for the 2006 season included:

References

External links

2000s Australian game shows
Television shows about poker
Poker in Australia
2006 Australian television series debuts
Fox8 original programming
Television shows set in Melbourne